Phineas McCray Casady (December 3, 1818 – September 2, 1908) was a pioneer, judge, lawyer, and state senator in Iowa. Casady was one of the early settlers of Pottawattamie County and a member of the influential Casady family who had a strong impact on the early history and legislation of Iowa.

Early life
Born in Connersville, Indiana, Casady migrated to Iowa in 1847. He first traveled to Des Moines, then onward to Native land on the frontier. His brother Jefferson P. Casady also served as a judge, lawyer, and state senator. His son Simon was a prominent Des Moines banker.

Death
Casady died on September 2, 1908. He is interred in the Casady family mausoleum at 	
Woodland Cemetery in Des Moines, Iowa. Woodlawn Cemetery is the oldest cemetery in Des Moines. The first burial in the cemetery was in 1850 of Casady's one year old son Thomas Casady.

Legacy
Casady was the first member and longtime Vice President of the Scotch-Irish Society of America and was responsible for the Society's sixth convention being held in Des Moines in 1894. In their proceedings, the Society praised Casady as "one of the pioneers of Iowa, going there in the days of the Indian and the buffalo" and who found "little difficulty inspiring others with his racial pride and enthusiasm."

The Casady School in Oklahoma City is named in honor of Phineas. The school was founded by his grandson Thomas Casady, an Episcopal bishop.

References

External links

1818 births
1908 deaths
19th-century American judges
19th-century American politicians
American lawyers
American people of Scotch-Irish descent
Burials at Woodland Cemetery (Des Moines, Iowa)
Businesspeople from Des Moines, Iowa
Casady family
Iowa state court judges
Democratic Party Iowa state senators
19th-century American businesspeople